Wauna is an unincorporated community on the Columbia River in Clatsop County, Oregon, United States. According to Oregon Geographic Names, it names a Native American mythological being associated with the Columbia River. There was a post office in Wauna from January 21, 1911 to circa 1980. Wauna is best known as the home of a Georgia-Pacific paper mill.

Unincorporated communities in Clatsop County, Oregon
1911 establishments in Oregon
Oregon populated places on the Columbia River
Unincorporated communities in Oregon
Company towns in Oregon